The Larceny Act 1916 was an Act of the Parliament of the United Kingdom. Its purpose was to consolidate and simplify the law relating to larceny triable on indictment and to kindred offences.

The definition of larceny for the purposes of the Act was "a person steals who, without the consent of the owner, fraudulently and without a claim of right made in good faith; takes and carries away anything capable of being stolen, with the intent at the time of such taking, permanently to deprive the owner thereof. Provided that a person may be guilty of stealing any such thing notwithstanding that he has lawful possession thereof, if, being a bailee or part owner thereof, he fraudulently converts the same to his own use or the use of any person other than the owner".

Section 23 provided maximum penalties for a number of offences of robbery and aggravated robbery.

Section 24 created the offence of sacrilege.

Section 25 created the offence of burglary.

Sections 29 to 31 related to blackmail.

Section 32 related to false pretences.

Repeal
The Larceny Act 1916 was abolished  on 1 January 1969, in respect of offences committed after that date. Larceny has been replaced by the broader offence of theft under section 1(1) of the Theft Act 1968. This offence did incorporate some of the terminology and substance of larceny.

See also
Larceny Act

References

United Kingdom Acts of Parliament 1916